Ty Michael Carter (born January 25, 1980) is a retired United States Army staff sergeant and a Medal of Honor recipient. He was awarded the United States Armed Forces' highest military honor for his actions during the 2009 Battle of Kamdesh in Afghanistan. Carter left active duty in September 2014.

Personal life
Carter was born in Spokane, Washington, on January 25, 1980, to Mark and Paula Carter, and moved to California's Bay Area in 1981. In 1991, his family moved back to Spokane, where he graduated from North Central High School in 1998. He later settled in Antioch, California until he enlisted in the US Marine Corps.

Carter married April Ait in 2004 and divorced in 2008, having one daughter, Madison (born 2005). He later married Shannon Derby in 2009 and divorced in 2015, having one daughter, Sehara. Carter is also the stepfather of Jayden Young, Shannon's son from a previous relationship. Carter is dating Jennifer "Jenn" Aedo since 2016. Carter and Adeo have one daughter, Eve (born April 2017). 

On July 13, 2000, his older brother, Seth Allen Carter (May 11, 1978 – July 13, 2000), was accidentally shot in the chest and killed by drunken friend Richard R. Sheppard, who was playing with a shotgun during a party in Spokane.

Military career

Carter enlisted in the United States Marine Corps October 13, 1998, and attended the Marine Corps Combat Engineer School. He later served in Okinawa, Japan, as an intelligence clerk. Carter showed promise in weapons’ marksmanship and was sent to Primary Marksmanship Instructor School in 1999. He served two short training deployments; one to San Clemente Island, California, and the other to Egypt, for Operation Bright Star. Carter was honorably discharged from the Marine Corps on 12 October 2002.

After his enlistment, Carter enrolled in college and studied biology at Los Medanos Community College in California where he met and began dating April Ait in early 2004. Ait soon became pregnant and they were married shortly thereafter. After the birth of their daughter Madison, some time traveling the United States, and subsequent divorce, Carter opted to join the United States Army.

Carter enlisted in the United States Army in January 2008 as a cavalry scout and received training at Fort Knox, Kentucky. From May 2009 to May 2010, he was deployed to Afghanistan with Bravo Troop, 3rd Squadron, 61st Cavalry Regiment, 4th Brigade Combat Team, 4th Infantry Division.

In October 2010, Carter was assigned as a Stryker gunner with the 8th Squadron, 1st Cavalry Regiment, 2nd Stryker Brigade Combat Team, 2nd Infantry Division at Joint Base Lewis-McChord, Washington. He was deployed to Afghanistan a second time in October 2012 and was thereafter stationed at Joint Base Lewis-McChord with the 7th Infantry Division. Carter works to destigmatize posttraumatic stress disorder (PTSD), which he prefers to be called "PTS", as he does not believe it should be termed a disorder. Carter has suffered from this condition. He left active duty in September 2014.

Medal of Honor action

While on his first deployment in Afghanistan, Carter was stationed at Combat Outpost (COP) Keating in Kamdesh District, Nuristan Province. On October 3, 2009, the outpost came under heavy attack and Carter, then a specialist, distinguished himself in what came to be known as the Battle of Kamdesh.

According to the detailed Official Narrative from the United States Army, more than 300 enemy fighters attacked COP Keating from surrounding high ground before 6 a.m. Under intense fire, Carter carried ammunition 100 meters across open ground from near his barracks to a Humvee at the south Battle Position, soon returning across the same distance to retrieve machine gun oil and more ammunition, and traverse that distance a third time to thus resupply the Battle Position. Though wounded within the first half-hour of battle, Carter provided accurate fire under intense pressure to drive back enemy that had infiltrated the camp perimeter.  He then crawled under continuing fire to another vehicle, and retrieved needed weapons and ammunition to bring back to the Battle Position. Carter crossed 30 meters of open space to provide life-extending first aid to a wounded soldier, exposed to enemy fire, then carrying him back across the 30 meters to the Humvee. As the battle progressed, Carter ran toward the Tactical Operations Center (TOC) to coordinate reconnaissance and to obtain medical care for the wounded soldier, but, encountering the body of a fallen sergeant, found and retrieved a radio and returned to the Humvee. Carter found a litter, and with a comrade carried the wounded soldier 100 meters across the original distance to an aid station; it was then about noon. The battle extended through nightfall when reinforcements could safely land by helicopter, by which time almost two-thirds of the 53 Coalition soldiers had been killed (8) or wounded (>25).

President Barack Obama presented Carter the Medal of Honor in a White House ceremony on August 26, 2013. The following day, Carter was inducted into the Pentagon Hall of Heroes.

Awards and decorations
During his military career, Carter received a number of decorations. Carter is authorized to wear two service stripes, three Overseas Service Bars, as well as the Combat Service Identification Badge for the 4th Infantry Division and the Distinctive Unit Insignia of the 61st Cavalry Regiment. Carter's military decorations include the following awards:

Medal of Honor citation

In popular culture
The film The Outpost, released on July 3, 2020, and based on the book The Outpost: An Untold Story of American Valor by Jake Tapper, follows the series of events on the US military outpost Combat Outpost Keating in the lead up to the Battle of Kamdesh on October 3, 2009. In the film, Carter is portrayed by Caleb Landry Jones; Scott Eastwood portrays Clinton Romesha.

Carter is featured in Medal of Honor Season 1, Episode 8.

See also

 List of post-Vietnam Medal of Honor recipients

References

External links

 Medal of Honor "Official Narrative", U.S. Army (detailed description of action)
 Medal of Honor "Presidential Remarks", 26 August 2013
 Speech after being awarded the Medal of Honor (video)

1980 births
United States Army personnel of the War in Afghanistan (2001–2021)
Living people
People from Antioch, California
Military personnel from Spokane, Washington
United States Army Medal of Honor recipients
United States Army non-commissioned officers
United States Marines
War in Afghanistan (2001–2021) recipients of the Medal of Honor
Military personnel from Washington (state)
Military personnel from California